The Elks Building in Olympia, Washington is a concrete building with a brick veneer that was built in 1919.  It was built for the Elks local chapter that had been formed in 1891.  It was listed on the National Register of Historic Places in 1988.

A 1985 historic buildings survey described it as the "only historic building built exclusively for a fraternal lodge still standing in Olympia."

References

National Register of Historic Places in Thurston County, Washington
Elks buildings
Buildings and structures in Olympia, Washington
Cultural infrastructure completed in 1919
Clubhouses in Washington (state)